The Rising of the Shield Hero is an anime series adapted from the light novels of the same title written by Aneko Yusagi. The series is produced by Kinema Citrus and directed by Takao Abo, with Keigo Koyanagi handling series composition, Masahiro Suwa designing the characters and Kevin Penkin composing the music. The series aired from January 9 to June 26, 2019, on AT-X and other channels. It ran for 25 episodes. The anime series is licensed in North America by Crunchyroll–Funimation partnership.

At 2019's Crunchyroll Expo, it was announced that the series would receive a second and third season. Then later at 2020's virtual Crunchyroll Expo, it was originally announced that the second season would premiere in October 2021, but it was later delayed. The second season aired from April 6 to June 29, 2022, on AT-X and other channels. Masato Jinbo replaced Takao Abo as director, and the rest of the staff members reprised their roles, with production by Kinema Citrus and DR Movie. The second season ran for 13 episodes. On May 2, 2022, Crunchyroll announced that the second season would begin streaming its English dub on May 4.

Series overview

Episode list

Season 1 (2019)

Season 2 (2022)

References

External links
 
 

Lists of anime episodes